Top Points is a railway station on the Zig Zag Railway in the Blue Mountains area of New South Wales.

It is situated at the reversal point of the Middle and Top Roads of the Lithgow Zig Zag. When the Zig Zag Railway reopened in October 1975, Top Points was a terminal station on the line. It originally consisted of a platform on the western side with the eastern platform constructed after the line was extended to Clarence. The area behind the eastern platform was a carpark.

In 2002, the former Cooerwull station footbridge was added to join the two platforms.

References

Railway stations in Australia opened in 1975
Regional railway stations in New South Wales